Yushanlu or Yavshanlu or Yowshanlu may refer to:
 Yushanlu, Hamadan
 Yushanlu, West Azerbaijan